The Liuwu Bridge (} crosses the Lhasa River linking downtown Lhasa, Tibet to Lhasa railway station and Niu New Area on the south bank.
It was built in conjunction with the  Qinghai–Tibet Railway, which terminates on the south side of the river, and provides a connection to the town center on the north side.

Location

The Liuwu Bridge links central Lhasa to Lhasa Railway Station and the newly developed Niu New Area of Doilungdêqên County on the south bank of the Lhasa River.
Residents in the Ne'u area were resettled to make way for the new development.
The  "Liuwu New District" includes new residential buildings in traditional Tibetan style.
The villagers, numbering almost 1,700, were moved into these buildings.
The effect of the railway, bridge and Liuwu New District development has been urbanization and development of new enterprises such as transport, retail outlets and restaurants.

Construction

The Liuwu Bridge was built by China Communications Construction.
The construction project began in 2004.
About 500 people worked on the bridge, but according to an Agence France-Presse correspondent even the laborers engaging in sweeping and pushing wheelbarrows were almost all Chinese, since the chief engineer said Tibetans "do not have the technical training needed for the task."
The bridge was completed in April 2007.
It was opened to traffic on 1 May 2007.
Total funding allocated to the project was RMB 388.51 million.

Structure

The bridge is one of the notable structures of the  Qinghai–Tibet Railway, the highest railway in the world.
It is the first urban overpass in the Tibet Autonomous Region.
The piers of the main bridge use piled underground diaphragm walls.
The structure includes the first cloverleaf junction in Tibet.

References

Sources

Buildings and structures in Lhasa
Bridges in Tibet
Chengguan District, Lhasa
Doilungdêqên District